James Wormley (January 16, 1819 – October 18, 1884) was the owner and operator of the Wormley Hotel, which opened in Washington D.C. in 1869 which was preceded by his boarding houses on I St. beginning in 1855. He was reported in 1865 to have been at the bedside of Abraham Lincoln when he died, but that claim has been widely disputed.

Wormley was born a free black citizen in 1819 in Washington.  He and his siblings believed they were of Indian descent. Wormley started out driving a carriage for his father, Lynch Wormley (ca. 1780-1852), who owned a livery near the Willard Hotel. In this capacity he met many prominent men in the city and turned those connections into an opportunity to manage a club in the city. He gained a reputation as a fine steward and worked for some time as a steward on a Mississippi riverboat and then as steward for Reverdy Johnson.

Wormley was instrumental, in 1871, in getting Congress to fund the city's first public elementary school for black students, the Sumner School, and chaired the committee that oversaw its construction.

The Wormley Hotel was at on the southwest corner of 15th and H streets of the northwest quadrant of the city.  The hotel was the site of the Wormley Agreement, which resolved the disputed presidential election of 1876, contested between Rutherford B. Hayes and Samuel J. Tilden, and this resolution led to the end of the Reconstruction period in the South.

Wormley died on October 18, 1884. He was interred at Columbian Harmony Cemetery in Washington, D.C. In the 1890s, following James Wormley's death, his son, James T. Wormley took over management of the hotel.

Legacy 

Wormley had chaired the committee that oversaw construction of an elementary school for black children in Georgetown at 3325 Prospect Street, near 33rd Street.  It opened as the Wormley School in 1885.  According to one source, the nearby neighborhood was mostly white, and the black children attending the school mostly came from the eastern part of Georgetown.  The school closed in 1952 and became an annex for school administration. The Wormley School building also had a brief second life as a public school for special-needs students. The building was also used from 1979-1994 as a school called Prospect Learning Center. The school worked with children who had learning disabilities and some emotional issues. This building was finally closed forever as a public school in June 1994 due to the District of Columbia not keeping up with maintenance over a period of many years. The Wormley building also had problems with asbestos and lead-based paint. After the building was shut down in 1994, it was sold to Georgetown University for $500,000. It was slated to be renovated into student housing; however, Georgetown never did anything with it, and the building and grounds sat vacant from 1994-2005. The historic building is now home to the Wormley Row condominiums. On the site of the old parking lot and playground, houses were built which match the character and time period of the neighborhood.

Wormley's life and achievements were featured in the Washington Post article "A Hotel for the History Books" by Nicholas E. Hollis on March 18, 2001. Hollis also addressed the American Bar Association and other audiences while launching a special recognition project honoring Wormley.

References

External links
 James Wormley Recognition Project website
 Portrait by Henry Ulke

1819 births
1884 deaths
Burials at Columbian Harmony Cemetery
American hoteliers
Businesspeople from Washington, D.C.
African-American businesspeople
19th-century American businesspeople
People associated with the assassination of Abraham Lincoln